Azumini is a town in Nigeria's Abia state. It is located some 15 miles south of the commercial city of Aba. It is famous for the Azumini Blue River.

Towns in Abia State

It is also an ancient slave trade route through the blue river commonly known in local dialect as Mini- Okigo.